Jessika Heiser (born June 25, 1991) is an American professional wrestling referee and former professional wrestler. She is signed to WWE in its SmackDown brand as a referee under the ring name Jessika Carr. After signing with the company in 2017, Heiser became the first female WWE referee since the 1980s. She is also known by her ring names Jessie Kaye and Kennadi Brink on the independent circuit. She regularly worked for Maryland Championship Wrestling.

Early life and career 
As a teenager, Heiser was overweight; she credits her love of wrestling and desire to become a wrestler as "her escape" and her inspiration to change. With help from a local professional wrestler, who was signed to a developmental contract with WWE, she was able to lose over 60 lbs and become an athlete.

In July 2010, she started training regularly at Duane Gill's Academy of Professional Wrestling in Severn, Maryland.

On October 21, 2021, Heiser refereed at Crown Jewel, becoming the first woman to referee in Saudi Arabia, as well as becoming the first female to referee a Hell in a Cell match.

Personal life 
Heiser credits The Rock, The Undertaker, Trish Stratus and Mickie James as her influences in professional wrestling.

Championships and accomplishments 
 Dynamite Championship Wrestling
 DCW Women's Championship (1 time)
 East Coast Wrestling Association
 ECWA Women's Championship (1 time)
 Pro Wrestling Illustrated
 Ranked No. 47 of the top 50 female wrestlers in the PWI Female 50 in 2014
 Vicious Outcast Wrestling
 VOW Vixens Championship (1 time)

References

External links 

 
 

1991 births
Living people
Sportspeople from Baltimore
American female professional wrestlers
Professional wrestlers from Maryland
Professional wrestling referees
21st-century American women
American women referees and umpires